Aaron Jameer Dobson (born July 23, 1991) is a former American football wide receiver. He was drafted by the New England Patriots in the second round of the 2013 NFL Draft and played college football at Marshall.

Early years
Dobson was born in Dunbar, West Virginia. He attended South Charleston High School in South Charleston, West Virginia, and played high school football and high school basketball for the South Charleston Black Eagles. He recorded 45 receptions for 1,298 yards and 17 touchdowns as a senior and added seven interceptions on defense, and finished his high school career with 108 receptions, 2,365 yards and 32 touchdowns. He had 10 interceptions, two of which he returned for touchdowns, and was a member of the 2008 MSAC Championship team and 2008 West Virginia AAA State Championship, which finished with a 14-0 record.

In 2009, he played for USA Football's U.S. Under-19 National Team that won the 2009 IFAF Under-19 World Championship in Canton, Ohio, where he was teammates with future New York Giants running back, David Wilson.

College career
Dobson attended Marshall University, where he played for the Marshall Thundering Herd football team from 2009 to 2012. During his college career, Dobson had 165 receptions for 2,398 yards and 24 touchdowns. As a junior in 2011, he was the MVP of the 2011 Beef 'O' Brady's Bowl. He ended his Marshall senior season being named 2nd team All-Conference USA and being invited to play in the Senior Bowl.

Dobson gained recognition in 2011 during a game against East Carolina, when he had a one-handed backhand catch for a touchdown in the second quarter. The play went viral and was ranked second on ESPN's Top 10 Plays of the Year.

Professional career

New England Patriots
The New England Patriots selected Dobson in the second round, with the 59th overall pick, of the 2013 NFL Draft. He signed a four-year, $3.4 million contract. His first career catch was for a touchdown against the New York Jets in Week 2. In a Week 9 win against the Pittsburgh Steelers, he had the first 100-yard game of his career. He caught five passes for 130 yards and two touchdowns. He suffered a foot injury in week 12 against the Broncos and missed weeks 13-15. He appeared in 12 games (nine starts) with 519 receiving yards and four touchdowns during his rookie campaign in 2013.

Dobson was inactive for eight of the first twelve weeks of the 2014 season before injuring his hamstring against the Green Bay Packers in Week 13. On December 4, 2014, he was placed on injured reserve. With Dobson on IR, the Patriots won Super Bowl XLIX after they defeated the defending champion Seattle Seahawks, 28-24.

Dobson was active for Week 1 against the Steelers on September 10, 2015. He played sparingly recording one reception for nine yards. In the second week, against the Buffalo Bills, he tied a career-high with seven catches, for 87 yards. He recorded a 17-yard pass from quarterback Tom Brady in a 20-13 win over the Bills in Week 11; on the play, he injured his ankle and had to leave the game. He was diagnosed with a high ankle sprain, and on November 26, 2015, the Patriots placed him on injured reserve, ending his season.

On September 3, 2016, Dobson was released by the Patriots as part of final roster cuts.

Detroit Lions
On September 21, 2016, Dobson was signed by the Detroit Lions. He was released on September 24, 2016. On September 27, 2016, he was re-signed by the Lions. He was released again on October 8, 2016.

Arizona Cardinals
On January 5, 2017, Dobson signed a reserve/future contract with the Arizona Cardinals. He was placed on injured reserve on September 2, 2017. He was released on September 6, 2017.

Career statistics

Regular season

Postseason

References

External links
 Marshall Thundering Herd bio
 New England Patriots bio

1991 births
Living people
American football wide receivers
Arizona Cardinals players
Detroit Lions players
Marshall Thundering Herd football players
New England Patriots players
People from Dunbar, West Virginia
Players of American football from West Virginia
South Charleston High School alumni
People from South Charleston, West Virginia